Zhu Su (8 October 1361 – 2 September 1425), the Prince of Wu (吳王, created 1370), later the  Prince of Zhou (周王), was a prince of the Ming dynasty. He was the fifth son of the Hongwu Emperor and Empress Ma. He was assigned to Kaifeng in 1381.

Family
Consorts and Issue:
 Princess consort of Zhou, of the Feng clan  (周王妃 馮氏; d. 1422), daughter of Feng Sheng, Duke of Song (宋國公 馮勝)
 Zhu Youndun, Prince Xian of Zhou (周憲王 朱有燉; 6 February 1379 – 1439), first son
 Zhou Yougao, Prince of Runan (汝南王 朱有爋; b. 11 May 1380 ), second son
 Lady, of the Ni clan (倪氏; 1360 – 1420), personal name Miaoding (妙定), daughter of Ni An (倪安)
 Princess Nanyang (南陽郡主), fourth daughter
Married Zhang Yi (張儀) in 1404
 Secondary consort of Zhou, of the Mu clan (周王次妃 穆氏; 1368–1425), personal name Miaofu (妙福)
 Furen, of the Hu clan (夫人 胡氏; d. 1435)
 Zhu Youkui, Prince Jian of Zhou (周簡王 朱有爝; 1392–1452), fourth son
 Zhou Youfu, Prince Kangjian of Yiyang (宜陽康簡王 朱有炥; d. 1470), ninth son
 Zhu Youxuan, Prince Kangyi of Fengqiu (封丘康懿王 朱有熅; 1407–1467), eleventh son
 Secondary consort of Zhou, of the Yang clan (周王次妃 杨氏; 1387–1425), personal name Miaoxiu (妙秀)
 Secondary consort of Zhou, of the Li clan (周王次妃 李氏; 1392–1444)
 Zhu Yougang, Prince Gongzhuang of Neixiang (內鄉恭莊王 朱有焵; 1410–1464), thirteenth son
 Zhu Youqiao, Prince Zhuangjian of Zuocheng (胙城莊簡王 朱有燆; 21 August 1411 – 9 September 1453), fourteenth son
 Lady, of the Chen clan (次妃 陳氏)
 Zhu Youguang, Prince Jingxi of Yongning (永寧靖僖王 朱有灮; 15 September 1393 – 1466), sixth son
 Zhu Youshan, Prince Gongxi of Ruyang (汝陽恭僖王 朱有煽;16 November 1396 – 1444), seventh son
 Lady, of the Zhou clan (周氏)
 Zhu Youkuang, Prince Gongding of Zhenping (鎮平恭定王 朱有爌; 1400–1471), eighth son
 Lady, of the Wang clan (王氏)
 Zhou Youjiong, Prince Daogong of Suiping (遂平悼恭王 朱有熲; 1405–1438), tenth son
 Unknown
 Zhou Youxuan, Prince Huaizhuang of Shunyang (順陽懷莊王 朱有烜; d. 1415), third son
 Zhou Youxi (朱有熹; 11 January 1393 – 1428), fifth son
 Zhu Youyi, Prince Daogong of Luoshan (羅山悼恭王 朱有熼; 1409–1420), twelfth son
 Fifteenth son
 Prince of Gushi, sixteenth son
 Princess Yifeng (儀封郡主), first daughter
Married Pu Zichun (溥子春) in 1402
 Princess Lanyang (蘭陽郡主), second daughter
Married Xu Maoxian (徐茂先) in 1402
 Princess Xinyang (信陽郡主), third daughter
Married Sheng Yu (盛瑜) in 1404
 Princess Yongcheng (永城郡主), fifth daughter
Married Cheng He (程和) in 1405
 Princess Xingyang (滎陽郡主), sixth daughter
Married Zhang Yi (張義) in 1406
 Princess Xinxiang (新鄉郡主), eighth daughter
Married Zhang Lin (張琳) in 1406
 Princess Ningling (寧陵郡主), ninth daughter
Married Qian Qin (錢欽) in 1411
 Princess Yian (宜安郡主), tenth daughter
Married Cai Yi (蔡義) in 1413
 Princess Chenliu (陳留郡主), eleventh daughter
Married Feng Xun (馮訓) in 1411
 Princess Shangshui (商水郡主), seventeenth daughter
Married Tian Jun (田俊) in 1431
 Princess Zhongmou (中牟郡主), eighteenth daughter
Married Zhuan Zhong (莊忠) in 1431
 Nineteenth daughter (1423–1433)

Traditional medicine
He was the author of a treatise on Chinese traditional medicine, the Jiuhuang Bencao.

Ancestry

References

Ming dynasty imperial princes
1361 births
1425 deaths
Sons of emperors